Branko Tucak (born 19 June 1952) is a Croatian former professional football player who last coached the Rwandan national team.

Career

Club career
Tucak played for NK Zagreb, Dinamo Zagreb, Metz, AS Nancy, Angers, Kortrijk and Thionville.

Coaching career
Tucak was appointed manager of the Rwandan national team in April 2008, and was sacked in November 2009. He has also coached in Croatia, France, Kuwait and Sudan.

In April 2014 it was announced that he was part of an 8-man shortlist to replace Eric Nshimiyimana as Rwanda manager.

References

External links
FC Metz profile

1952 births
Living people
People from Split-Dalmatia County
Association football defenders
Yugoslav footballers
NK Zagreb players
GNK Dinamo Zagreb players
FC Metz players
AS Nancy Lorraine players
Angers SCO players
K.V. Kortrijk players
Thionville FC players
Yugoslav First League players
Ligue 1 players
Ligue 2 players
Yugoslav expatriate footballers
Expatriate footballers in France
Yugoslav expatriate sportspeople in France
Expatriate footballers in Belgium
Yugoslav expatriate sportspeople in Belgium
Croatian football managers
HNK Šibenik managers
NK Hrvatski Dragovoljac managers
NK Zagreb managers
Al-Hilal Club (Omdurman) managers
Al-Merrikh SC managers
NK Istra 1961 managers
Rwanda national football team managers
Croatian Football League managers
Croatian expatriate football managers
Expatriate football managers in Sudan
Croatian expatriate sportspeople in Sudan
Expatriate football managers in Rwanda